Dennis Joseph Schmidt is an American philosopher living in Sydney, Australia where he is Research Professor and Chair at Western Sydney University. Prior to moving to Sydney in 2015, he taught at Binghamton University (1982-1994), Villanova University (1994-2003), and Penn State University (2003-2015).  He is known for his research on ancient Greek philosophy and literature, post-Kantian philosophy, hermeneutics and philosophy of art.
He received his PhD in philosophy from the Boston College in 1982.

Dennis was a known friend and student to Hans-Georg Gadamer for several years. Dennis Schmidt lives with his wife, Jennifer Mensch (who also teaches at Western Sydney University and is the author of 'Kant's Organisim') and his daughter Zoe Schmidt.

Schmidt is the editor of "SUNY Press Series in Contemporary Continental Philosophy" which has published a number of important works in the contemporary Continental tradition.  In addition to his own publications Schmidt has substantially revised and edited Joan Stambaugh's 1995 translation of Martin Heidegger's Being and Time (1927).

Bibliography
 Schmidt, D. (2014), 'Idiome der Wahrheit', : Vittorio Klostermann 9783465042273.
 Schmidt, D. (2012), 'Between Word and Image: Heidegger, Klee, and Gadamer on Gesture and Genesis', : Indiana University Press 9780253006189.
 On Germans and Other Greeks: Tragedy and Ethical Life (Indiana University Press, 2001)
 The Ubiquity of the Finite: Hegel, Heidegger and the Entitlements of Philosophy, MIT Press: Cambridge, Massachusettsm, 1988
 The Difficulties of Ethical Life, Fordham UP, 2008. Co-edited with Shannon Sullivan
 Lyrical and Ethical Subjects (SUNY Press, 2005)
 Hermeneutische Wege (co-edited with Günter Figal, Mohr-Siebeck Verlag, 2000)

See also
German philosophy

References

External links
 Dennis Schmidt at Pennsylvania State University
 Dennis Schmidt at Western Sydney University

20th-century essayists
20th-century American male writers
20th-century American non-fiction writers
20th-century American philosophers
21st-century essayists
21st-century American male writers
21st-century American non-fiction writers
21st-century American philosophers
American male essayists
American male non-fiction writers
American scholars of ancient Greek philosophy
Morrissey College of Arts & Sciences alumni
Bucknell University alumni
Continental philosophers
Gadamer scholars
German–English translators
Heidegger scholars
Hermeneutists
Historians of philosophy
Living people
Pennsylvania State University faculty
Philosophers of art
Philosophers of culture
Philosophers of literature
Philosophers of nihilism
Philosophy academics
Philosophy writers
Translators of Martin Heidegger
Translators of philosophy
Academic staff of Western Sydney University
Year of birth missing (living people)